This is a list of notable East Coast hip hop music record labels.

 American King Music, founded in 2006 by Mims
 ASAP Worldwide, founded in 2011 by ASAP Rocky and ASAP Yams
 Babygrande, founded in 2001 by DJ Chuck Wilson
 Bad Boy Records, founded in 1993 by Sean Combs
 Blacksmith Records, founded in 2005 by Talib Kweli and Cory Smith
 Bloodline Records, founded in 2000 by DMX
 Cold Chillin' Records, founded in 1987 by Tyrone Williams
 D-Block Records, founded in 2001 by The Lox
 Dame Dash Music Group, founded in 2005 by Damon Dash
 Def Jam Recordings, founded in 1983 by Rick Rubin and Russell Simmons
 Definitive Jux, founded in 1999 by Jaime "El-P" Meline and Amaechi Uzoigwe
 Desert Storm Records, founded in 1997 by Duro and DJ Clue
 Diplomat Records, founded in 2002 by Cam'ron 
 Dream Chasers Records, founded in 2012 by Meek Mill
 Duck Down Records, founded in 1995 by Dru Ha and Buckshot
 Enjoy Records, founded in 1962 by Bobby Robinson
 Flipmode Records, founded in 1994 by Busta Rhymes
 Fort Knocks Entertainment, founded in 2004 by Just Blaze
 Full Surface Records, founded in 2001 by Swizz Beatz
 G-Unit Records, founded in 2003 by 50 Cent
 Get Low Records, founded in 1999 by Memphis Bleek
 Good Hands Records, founded in 2002 by DJ Truth and Art Beeswax
 Griselda Records, founded in 2014 by Westside Gunn and Conway the Machine
 Ill Will Records, founded in 1999 by Nas
 Infamous Records, founded in 2000 by Mobb Deep
 Murder Inc. Records, founded in 1998 by Irv Gotti and Chris Gotti
 Loud Records, founded in 1991 by Steve Rifkind
 M3 Records, founded in 2003 by Masta Ace
 MVBEMG, founded in 2011 by Sosa
 MVB Records, founded in 2006 by Abdel Russell
 Rawkus Records, founded in 1995 by Brian Brater and Jarret Myer
 Relativity Records, founded in 1982 by Barry Kobrin
 Luke Records, founded in 1990 by Uncle Luke
 Roc-A-Fella Records, founded in 1995 by Jay-Z , Damon Dash and Kareem Burke
 Ruff Ryders, founded in 1988, by The Dean Family
 RSMG, founded in 2005 by Russell Simmons
 Select Records, founded in 1981 by Fred Munao
 Streetsweepers Entertainment, founded in 2000 by DJ Kay Slay
 Terror Squad Entertainment, founded in 1997 by Fat Joe
 Tommy Boy Entertainment, founded in 1981 by Tom Silverman
 Slip-n-Slide Records, founded in 1994 by Ted Lucas
 TrapHouse Icon, founded in 2001 by Mark. R
 TVT Records, founded in 1985 by Steve Gottlieb
 Uptown Records, founded in 1986 by Andre Harrell
 Violator, founded by Chris Lighty
 ZNO Records, founded in 2001 by Benzino
East Coast hip hop